Atanas Nikolovski (born 22 June 1980 in Skopje) is a Macedonian slalom canoer who has competed since the mid-1990s.

In 2009, Atanas achieved 14th place in the world ranking race in Sydney, Australia. He came 1st in the semi finals, and 7th in the finals of the 2010 ICF Canoe Slalom World Championships. At the 2008 Summer Olympics in Beijing, he was the flag-bearer for his nation during the opening ceremonies of those games. In the K-1 event, Nikolovski was eliminated in the qualifying round, finishing in 19th place.

Atanas is sponsored by Herbalife.

References
Sports-Reference.com profile

1980 births
Canoeists at the 2008 Summer Olympics
Living people
Macedonian male canoeists
Olympic canoeists of North Macedonia